Charming Charlie is a women's contemporary fashion and accessories retailer based in Houston, Texas.

History 
Launched in 2004 by founder and former chief executive officer, Charlie Chanaratsopon, the brand is known for offering a wide array of women's apparel and fashion accessories, beauty, gifts and more, all arranged by color.  Charming Charlie filed for bankruptcy in 2017, but attempted to reorganize and continue operations. In July 2019, however, the firm announced that it was filing for a second bankruptcy, and planned to close all 261 of its remaining stores. In November 2019, it was announced Charming Charlie planned to relaunch as an online-focused retailer with a select number of smaller retail stores, from 3,000 to 4,000 sq ft, as well as pop-up stores in select locations. The relaunch is led by founder Charlie Chanaratsopon, who had previously purchased the company's trademarks out of bankruptcy in September that year.

Awards

In 2013, Charming Charlie was awarded with The Accessories Council's "Specialty Retailer" ACE Award, ranked number 745 on Inc. Magazine's annual list of "Top 5,000 Fastest-Growing Businesses," and was featured on Forbes Magazine's "Ones to Watch" list. Prior to that, in 2010, Charming Charlie received the "Hot Retailer of the Year" award from the International Council of Shopping Centers (ICSC) and the "Marketer of the Year" award in the Retail Category from the American Marketing Association (AMA).  Within the same year, Charlie was honored with Ernst & Young Entrepreneur of the Year Award in the Retail Category.

References

Defunct retail companies of the United States
Companies based in Houston
Defunct companies based in Texas
Retail companies established in 2004
Retail companies disestablished in 2019
Companies that filed for Chapter 11 bankruptcy in 2017
Companies that filed for Chapter 11 bankruptcy in 2019
Clothing retailers of the United States
Eyewear retailers of the United States
Clothing brands of the United States
Eyewear brands of the United States
2004 establishments in Texas
2019 disestablishments in Texas
Clothing companies disestablished in 2019